The Hagwilget Village First Nation is a First Nations band government, a subgroup of the (Gitxsan) people, located at Hagwilget, British Columbia, Canada, which is just east of Hazelton, British Columbia.  The band is one of the 13 member governments of the |Hereditary Chiefs of the Gitxsan, which functions as a tribal council (but is a traditional government) in alliance with the 35 members of the Hereditary Chiefs of the Gitxsan.

Chief and Councillors

Demographics
INAC number 534, the Hagwilget Village First Nation had 694 members as of July 2009.

References

External links
Hagwilget website

Bulkley Valley
Skeena Country